The Adam and Johanna Feldman House, located in the greater Portland, Oregon, area is listed on the National Register of Historic Places.  It is located in an unincorporated part of Washington County, in the Garden Home–Whitford area.

See also
 National Register of Historic Places listings in Washington County, Oregon

References

1890 establishments in Oregon
Houses completed in 1890
Houses on the National Register of Historic Places in Portland, Oregon
National Register of Historic Places in Washington County, Oregon
1890s architecture in the United States